George Malcolm may refer to:

 George Alexander Malcolm (1810–1888), British Army officer
 George Malcolm (Indian Army officer) (1818–1897), officer in the Bombay Army and British East India Company
 George Malcolm (politician) (1865–1931), politician in Manitoba, Canada
 George A. Malcolm (1881–1961), American lawyer and judge in the Philippines
 George Malcolm (footballer) (1889–1965), English footballer
 George Malcolm (musician) (1917–1997), English harpsichordist, organist and conductor